Handle Ur Bizness is an 8-track EP featuring exclusive material from M.O.P. as a teaser for the upcoming album First Family 4 Life released the same year. The EP features five original songs, two skits plus a remix of the title track which later also appeared on the album.
The EP is now out of print.

Track listing 

1998 EPs
M.O.P. albums
Albums produced by DJ Premier